Mario J. McNulty (born December 1978) is an American Grammy Award-winning record producer and audio engineer based in New York City, United States. He has worked with David Bowie, Prince, Nine Inch Nails, The B-52s, Julian Lennon and many other well-known recording artists. At the 50th Annual Grammy Awards, along with artist Angélique Kidjo and producer Tony Visconti, McNulty won a Grammy in the Best Contemporary World Music category for the album Djin Djin (2007). Other Grammy-nominated albums include Homeland by Laurie Anderson in 2009 and Bowie's The Next Day in 2013.

Discography

 2018 – Never Let Me Down 2018 by David Bowie; Producer, Engineer, Mixer.
 2015 – Heart of a Dog by Laurie Anderson; Mixer.
 2015 – Live Plus One by Michael Gallant Trio; Mixer.
 2014 – Lumiere by Sasha Lazard; Mixer.
 2014 – Under My Skin by Tempt; Mixer.
 2014 – Nothing Has Changed by David Bowie; Engineer, Mixer.
 2014 – White Women by Chromeo; String Engineer.
 2013 – Completely by Michael Gallant Trio; Engineer, Mixer.
 2013 – The Next Day by David Bowie; Engineer.
 2012 – Sudden Love by Sean Wood; Producer, Engineer, Mixer.
 2012 – Sunday Love by Fefe Dobson; 5.1 Engineer.
 2011 – Teeth of Champions by The Madison Square Gardeners; Mixer.
 2011 – Garden in Flames by Tam Lin; Producer, Engineer, Mixer.
 2011 – "December Sky" by Julian Lennon and Tomi Swick; Engineer.
 2011 – Everything Changes by Julian Lennon; Engineer, Mixer.
 2011 – Florizona by The Silos; Mixer.
 2010 – Homeland by Laurie Anderson; Engineer, Mixer.
 2010 – A Thousand Suns by Linkin Park; Engineer.
 2010 – Hooked! by Lucy Woodward; Engineer.
 2010 – Raise Hope For Congo by various artists; Engineer.
 2010 – "Kentish Town Waltz" by Imelda May; Engineer
 2009 - The World Is As You Are by Halph; Engineer, Mixer, Producer
 2009 – North, South, East, West...Anthology by Tim Finn; Mixer.
 2009 – Lightheaded by Citizens; Mixer.
 2009 – Alter the Ending by Dashboard Confessional; String Engineer.
 2009 – Keep Your Soul: A Tribute to Doug Sahm by various artists; Mixer.
 2009 – Listen: Our Time Theater Company by various artists; Mixer.
 2009 – N.E.D. [No Evidence of Disease] by N.E.D.; Producer, Engineer, Mixer.
 2009 – The People or the Gun by Anti-Flag; Mixer.
 2008 – Folie à Deux by Fall Out Boy; String Engineer.
 2008 – Beauty Dies by The Raveonettes; Mixer.
 2008 – Real Animal by Alejandro Escovedo; Engineer.
 2008 – The Bright Lights of America by Anti-Flag; Engineer, Percussion.
 2008 – We Love You by Semi Precious Weapons; Producer, Engineer, Mixer.
 2008 – iSelect by David Bowie (song: "Time Will Crawl (MM Remix)"); Engineer, Mixer, Remixer.
 2008 – Glass Box: A Nonesuch Retrospective by Philip Glass; Assistant Engineer.
 2008 – Pictures of Tuva by Chirgilchin; Engineer, Mixer.
 2007 – David Bowie box set by David Bowie; Engineer, Drums, Percussion, Mixer.
 2007 – Djin Djin by Angélique Kidjo; Engineer.
 2007 – Please Don't Almost Kill Me by The Cloud Room; Producer, Engineer, Mixer.
 2006 - Ode To You by Halph; Mixer
 2006 – Come On Like the Fast Lane by The Silos; Engineer.
 2006 – No Balance Palace by Kashmir; Digital Editing, Engineer.
 2006 – Timothy J. Brown: Songs of Light, Songs of Shadows by Justin Ryan; Engineer.
 2006 – Plague Songs by various artists; Engineer, Mixer.
 2005 – Stage (reissue); Digital Editing, Engineer (original release 1978).
 2005 – David Live (reissue) by David Bowie; Digital Editing, Engineer (original release 1974).
 2005 – Stealth soundtrack; Engineer.
 2005 – Sweetheart: Love Songs by various artists; Assistant Engineer.
 2004 – A Reality Tour by David Bowie; Digital Editing, Engineer, Pro-Tools, 5.1 Engineer.
 2004 – Beyond Elysian Fields by Hugh Cornwell; Engineer, Digital Editing, Pro-Tools.
 2004 – Dreams That Breathe Your Name by Elysian Fields; Assistant Engineer.
 2004 – Everyone Is Here by Finn Brothers; Engineer.
 2004 – Lifeblood by Manic Street Preachers, Engineer.
 2004 – X by Kristeen Young; Engineer.
 2004 – Diamond Dogs (30th Anniversary Edition) by David Bowie; Digital Editing, Engineer (original release 1974).
 2004 – Born to Boogie by T Rex; Engineer.
 2003 – Charlie's Angels: Full Throttle soundtrack; Engineer.
 2003 – Dragonfly by Ziggy Marley; Assistant Engineer.
 2003 – Julia Darling by Julia Darling; Assistant Engineer.
 2003 – L'Avventura by Dean Wareham and Britta Phillips; Additional Production, Assistant Engineer, Audio Engineer, Pro-Tools.
 2003 – In Keeping Secrets of Silent Earth: 3 by Coheed and Cambria; Engineer.
 2003 – Music From the Thin Blue Line by Philip Glass; Engineer (original release 1989).
 2003 – Reality by David Bowie; Engineer, Mixer Assistant, Drums, Percussion.
 2003 – Chain Gang of Love by The Raveonettes; Assistant Engineer.
 2003 – The Complex by Blue Man Group; Additional Production, Pro-Tools.
 2003 – Want One by Rufus Wainwright; Assistant Engineer.
 2003 – "Queen of All the Tarts (Overture)" by David Bowie; Engineer.
 2002 – Naqoyqatsi soundtrack by Philip Glass; Assistant Engineer.
 2002 – Philip Glass: A Descent into the Maelström by Philip Glass; Assistant Engineer.
 2002 – Philip Glass: Saxophone by Philip Glass; Assistant Engineer.
 2002 – Toy by Everett Bradley; Assistant Engineer.
 2002 – Early Voice: Music by Philip Glass; Assistant Engineer.
 2002 – The Hours soundtrack by Philip Glass; Assistant Engineer.

References

External links
 Interview on production of Laurie Anderson album Homeland   
 Interview on engineering of David Bowie’s The Next Day
 Interview on production of Tam Lin
 Interview with Glyph Production Technologies
 Interview on mixing of Michael Gallant Trio

1978 births
Living people
American audio engineers
Record producers from Arizona